Eduardo Lorente Ginesta (born 24 May 1977 in Barcelona, Catalonia) is a freestyle swimmer from Spain, who competed at two consecutive Summer Olympics for his native country, starting in 2000 in Sydney, Australia. The sprinter won the gold medal in the 50m Freestyle at the European SC Championships 2006 in Helsinki, Finland.

References
 Spanish Olympic Committee

1977 births
Living people
Spanish male freestyle swimmers
Olympic swimmers of Spain
Swimmers at the 2000 Summer Olympics
Swimmers at the 2004 Summer Olympics
Swimmers from Barcelona

Mediterranean Games silver medalists for Spain
Swimmers at the 2005 Mediterranean Games
Mediterranean Games medalists in swimming